Skaņkalne parish is an administrative territorial entity of Valmiera Municipality in the Vidzeme region of Latvia. Prior to 2009, it was an administrative unit of the former Valmiera District. Town Mazsalaca is parish administrative center.

Towns, villages and settlements of Skaņkalne parish 
 Dzintari
 Ģenderti
 Jaunatne
 Ķurbēni
 Silaņģi

References

External links

Parishes of Latvia
Valmiera Municipality
Vidzeme